Jack Sargeant may refer to:

 Jack Sargeant (politician) (born 1994), Welsh politician
 Jack Sargeant (writer) (born 1968), British-Australian author

See also
 Jack Sergeant (born 1995), Gibraltarian footballer